The Northern Caucasus Operation was fought between the White and Red Armies during the Russian Civil War between December 1918 and  March 1919. The White Army captured the entire Northern Caucasus. The Red Army withdrew to Astrahan and the Volga delta.

Prelude 
In summer and autumn 1918, the Red Army had been defeated in the Second Kuban Campaign and Ekaterinodar, Novorossiysk, Maykop, Armavir and Stavropol were lost. Red Army commander Ivan Sorokin rebelled against the Revolutionary Military Council of the North Caucasus, shot several of its members and fled, but was arrested and shot without trial by a regiment commander of the Taman army.

After the loss of Stavropol on November 15, 1918, the forces of the Taman Army and the former Sorokin's army were consolidated into the 11th Red Army, which held the Zavetnoye-Petrovskoye-Remontnoye-Priyutnoye-Dry Buivola-Oak-Kursavka-Vorovskolesskaya-Kislovodsk-Nalchik front line, which roughly ran north–south. It was joined by the weak 12th Red Army which held the front line from Grozny over Kizlyar to the Terechnoye station, which ran west–east. On December 8, 1918, both of these armies became part of a separate Caspian-Caucasian Front under command of Mikhail Svechnikov. The Front headquarters were located in Astrakhan, which wasn't ideal, as there were 400 km of desert  between the front and the headquarters.

The campaign 
On December 19, 1918, the Caspian-Caucasian Front received orders from Moscow to attack. The 11th Army was to launch an offensive against the Armavir -Tikhoretsk line held by the White troops of Denikin, while the 12th Army was to attack the Makhachkala - Derbent line with the support of the Astrakhan-Caspian Military Flotilla.

On 2 January 1919, V. Kruze's Eleventh Army attacked Batalpashinsk, but the troops of the 11th Army were not able to carry out the assigned tasks, which was poorly planned. On 6 January, Wrangel counterattacked taking Blagodarny.  The Taman Army counter-attacked twice, but were unable to retake the town. The Eleventh Army's 4th division, withdrew partly to Elista, and partly to Yashkul. When two brigades of the 3rd Infantry Division also withdrew in divergent directions, the White Army was able to transform the initial success of its counterattack into a general defeat of the 11th Army.  According to Peter Kenez, "From this point on, the disintegration of the E;eventh army was remarkably rapid."Kislovodsk and Piatigorsk were taken on January 20, Grozny on February 5 and Vladikavkaz on February 10.

The 12th Army was also forced to conduct defensive battles in the districts of Kizlyar and west of Guryev. The defeat of the 11th Army made the 12th Army retreated towards the region of Astrakhan.
The Red Army, already badly organized and poorly disciplined, had also been decimated by a typhus epidemic.
General Avtonomov was one of its victims. General Wrangel was also infected, but survived. 

On February 4, 1919, the Stavropol Front was created to defend Astrakhan. In February 1919, the troops of the Front managed to secure Astrakhan and the mouth of the Volga and to prevent the union of Denikin's troops with the Ural white Cossacks. In March, the Caucasian-Caspian Front of the Red Army was disbanded, and the 11th and 12th Armies were consolidated into one, the 11th Army (second formation).

References 

Battles of the Russian Civil War
Battles involving Chechnya
Conflicts in 1918